Faxonius validus, the powerful crayfish, is a species of crayfish in the family Cambaridae. It is found in North America.

The IUCN conservation status of Faxonius validus is "LC", least concern, with no immediate threat to the species' survival. This status was last reviewed in 2010.

References

Further reading

External links

 

Cambaridae
Articles created by Qbugbot
Freshwater crustaceans of North America
Crustaceans described in 1914
Taxa named by Walter Faxon
Taxobox binomials not recognized by IUCN